Squad Leader is a game system depicting tactical combat in the Second World War. The game and three additional gamettes are open-ended, a trend in tactical board wargaming beginning from the 1970s and most notably seen in Avalon Hill's highly successful PanzerBlitz. The use of geomorphic mapboards and counters representing small tactical units gave the game great flexibility and the potential to recreate a wide range of situations.

These situations are presented to players in the form of Scenarios.  The original Squad Leader game comes with 12 scenarios and other scenarios, numbered in sequence, followed on in the three sequel gamettes. There are also many "official" scenarios (published by Avalon Hill) in The General Magazine or sold as special releases (the Rogue Scenarios).

In total, 123 official scenarios were made for the Squad Leader series.

Scenario Format
Each scenario in the original four game releases was printed on an 8-1/2" x 11" cardstock with the following elements in place:

 Scenario number
 Illustrative graphic
 Historical overview
 Board configuration and orientation
 Listing of rules sections introduced
 Victory Conditions
 Turn Record Chart
 Countermix and historical identity of scenario forces
 Scenario Special Rules
 Variations
 Historical Aftermath

Scenario Number
The original core scenarios from the 4 games are numbered as follows:

Squad Leader - 1 through 12

Cross of Iron - 13 through 20

Crescendo of Doom - 21 through 32

GI: Anvil of Victory - 33 through 47

Illustrative Graphic
These are illustration evocative of the events portrayed in the scenario, usually a black and white interpretation of an actual Second World War photograph.  Rodger MacGowan did the artwork for the original SL, COI and COD scenarios and Charles Kibler took over with GI: Anvil of Victory.

Historical Overview
A paragraph description of the military situation, placing the scenario in context, possibly introducing the personalities portrayed on the map. Prefaced by the actual location (usually the nearest town or city) and date.

Board Configuration and Orientation
A graphic representation of which boards to use, how to orient them, which direction is "north" and placement of terrain overlays (if any).

Listing of Rules Sections Introduced
The four Squad Leader games use Programmed Instruction to teach the game system; each scenario included with the games listed the new rules sections introduced with that scenario.

Victory Conditions
Squad Leader scenarios use unique sets of victory conditions, in some instances being complicated. The Victory Conditions often model real military objectives. For example, a scenario about an assault on a village might specify occupying buildings as victory conditions. A scenario based on withdrawal might specify that a certain number of units have to be exited from the map in order to win.

Turn Record Chart
Fixed game turn limits govern each scenarios, and one side is required to set up first and/or move first.  The turn record chart also shows turns on which reinforcements arrive.

Countermix and Historical Identity of Scenario Forces
Each official scenario is based on an actual historical event (with the exception of Scenario 26 which was based on a hypothetical operation).  Historical names are provided for the forces of each side (sometimes broadly, as in "elements of the 62nd Army" and often specifically down to the company or platoon level.)

Counter-mixes are listed for both sides, with number of units being specified as well as where they are set up (or enter, if reinforcements).

Scenario Special Rules
Scenario Special Rules (or SSRs) provide flexibility to designers; helping recreate an historically accurate scenario.  Rule modifications can achieve specific effects on game-play.

Historical Aftermath
A paragraph summary of the outcome of the situation being depicted.

Scenario Listing - Official Scenarios (Games and Gamettes)

Scenario Listing - Other Official Scenarios (Avalon Hill)

Series 100
Avalon Hill released Series 100, ten new scenarios for Cross of Iron, in 1979. The scenarios were designed by Courtney Allen (SL playtester and designer of Storm Over Arnhem).

Series 200
Avalon Hill released Series 200 with 10 new scenarios for Crescendo of Doom.

Rogue Series 200
The Rogue Scenarios Series 200, named because they used boards 9, 10 and 11 which were not "official" boards at the time, utilized rules up to Crescendo of Doom. Some of the scenarios needed multiple copies of several boards; if one wanted to play Scenario R220, which combined Scenarios R218 and R219 into one large scenario played in three parts - foreshadowing campaign games in Historical ASL.

Series 300
Avalon Hill released Series 300 with additional scenarios for GI: Anvil of Victory.

The General Magazine
Over the years, Avalon Hill also released scenarios in issues of their The General Magazine.

ASL Annual
The final "official" scenarios issued by Avalon Hill for the original Squad Leader game were in the first two issues of the ASL Annual.

All official Squad Leader scenarios printed by Avalon Hill have been reissued for Advanced Squad Leader and released in either The General Magazine, ASL Annuals or scenario packs.  The ASL Journal had released seven scenarios for Squad Leader but Multi-Man Publishing has indicated no intention to support the original SL game system.

Scenario Listing - Non Official Scenarios

Wargamer Magazine
The Wargamer Magazine also released scenarios 81-90, and a pack with scenarios 91-100 in 1982. These were designed by many of the contributors and players who helped design "official" scenarios.

REFERENCES
The Australian Wargamer - Original Squad Leader scenarios

ASL Scenario Archive

ASL.Net

WARGAME ACADEMY; Resource for Historical Boardgaming Simulation - SQUAD LEADER ACADEMY SQL SERIES SCENARIO RESOURCES

Squad Leader
World War II board wargames